Hawk of the Caribbean, also known as  Caribbean Hawk, is a 1962 Italian pirate film written and directed  by Piero Regnoli and starring Johnny Desmond and Yvonne Monlaur.

Plot

Cast
 Johnny Desmond as Juan Rodrigo Olivares
 Yvonne Monlaur as Arica Mageiras
 Armando Francioli as Esteban
 Piero Lulli as Manuel
 Franca Parisi as Donna Maria de la Rey Sandoval
 Walter Brandi as Ramon 
 Elvi Lissiak as Lolita
 Vincenzo Musolino as Rodriguez 
 Graziella Granata as Flora
 Amedeo Trilli as Pablo 	
 Franco Santi as Pedrito
 Nerio Bernardi   		
 Nino Marchesini as Viceking of Santa Cruz
 Carlo Lombardi as Captain Pinto 
 Claudio Undari as Don Pedro de Alicante

Production
Yvonne Monlaur stated that the film went through production difficulties which caused a month long halt to filming. This led to many scripted scenes left unfilmed.

Release
Hawk of the Caribbean was released in Italy on 5 April 1962.

References

Footnotes

Sources

External links

1962 adventure films
Italian adventure films
Pirate films
Films directed by Piero Regnoli
Italian swashbuckler films
1960s Italian-language films
1960s Italian films